is a Japanese manga series written and illustrated by Masahiro Hirakata. It was originally a one-shot published in Shueisha's Jump Giga magazine in April 2020, before being serialized in the Shōnen Jump+ website starting in December of the same year. The series has been compiled into six tankōbon volumes as of March 2023.

Premise
The series centers around the titular Debby the Corsifa, the strongest devil in history. Realizing that no demon can possibly match her in a fight, she decides to alleviate her boredom by traveling to Earth and killing some humans. Coming across high school student Sugo Rokurou, she explains that she wants nothing more but a challenge. Rokurou manages to persuade her into playing old maid, and Debby accepts - with the rule that if she wins, she will kill him. However, while playing Rokurou realizes something astounding - while Debby is incredibly strong, she is a borderline idiot when it comes to anything else!

Characters

Publication
It began serialization in the Shōnen Jump+ website on December 7, 2020. Shueisha published the first tankōbon volume on April 30, 2021. As of March 2023, six volumes have been released.

In June 2022, a promotional anime commercial was released, featuring scenes from the manga's first three chapters and its eighth chapter.

Volume list

Reception
In 2022, the series was nominated in the Next Manga Awards in the Web Manga category, and ranked 15th out of 50 nominees.

Tamagomago of Comicspace found the series fun, and described Debby and her personality as endearing and "full of charm."

See also
Shinmai Fukei Kiruko-san, another manga series by the same author

References

External links
  

Comedy anime and manga
Demons in anime and manga
Japanese webcomics
Shōnen manga
Shueisha manga
Webcomics in print